The city of St. John's is made up of many neighbourhoods. Neighbourhoods such as Georgestown and Rabbittown have long histories in the city and were among the first residential neighbourhoods to be built, while other neighbourhoods such as the Goulds and Kilbride are former communities that have been amalgamated with St. John's.

City Centre
The Battery
Buckmaster's Circle
Cookstown: Area at top of Long's Hill
Dogstown: Off Duckworth St. E.
Downtown
St. John's Ecclesiastical District
Fort Amherst
Georgestown–includes Tubridtown and Monkstown.
Quidi Vidi
Rabbittown

East End
Bally Haly
Churchill Park
East Meadows
Hoylestown
Pleasantville
Rennies Mill Road
Quidi Vidi

Northeast
Airport Heights
Clovelly Trails
King William Estates
Wedgewood Park
Virginia Park

West End
Amherst Heights
Bristolwood
Cowan Heights
Grovesdale Park
Kenmount Terrace
Mundy Pond
Waterford Valley
Westgate
Wishingwell Park

Southeast
Blackhead
Kilbride
Shea Heights

Southwest
 Brookfield Plains
 Galway
Goulds
 Richmond Hill
Southlands

References